The Kuha-class minesweepers is a series of six inshore minesweepers of the Finnish Navy. The ships were constructed in 1974–1975. All the vessels of the class were modified and modernized in the late 1990s, including a lengthening of the hull. Two of the class were withdrawn from service in 2012. The rest of the class will be retired with the entry into service of the s.

Description
Designed in the 1970s, the hulls of the minesweepers are constructed from glass-reinforced plastic.

The Kuha class are powered by two Cummins NT-380M diesel engines using hydrostatic transmission to turn one shaft and two controllable pitch propellers, creating . The engines are flexibly mounted and they have active rudders. The Kuha class have a complement of either 2 or 3 officers and 12 enlisted.

The ships had two different armament types to begin with, initially armed with either two single  guns or two ZU /60 calibre guns mounted in a single gun turret with an additional 20 mm gun. The armament was later made uniform throughout the class, with the twin-mounted 23 mm guns augmented with a  machine gun. For minesweeping duties, the Kuha class are equipped with equipment to deal with magnetic, acoustic and pressure mines capable of towing a Type F-82 electrode sweep. The minesweepers have Reson Seabat 6012 mine avoidance sonar, Patria Finavitec SONAC HF minehunting sonar and Racal Decca radar. The Kuha class were also capable of remote operating a  drone minesweeper, which were put in operation beginning in 1983.

Vessels of the class

Construction and career
Due to limitations set by treaties following the end of World War II, the Finnish Navy was limited in the number and size of ships, along with the number of sailors the Finnish Navy was allowed to employ. Therefore, during the Cold War, the Finnish Navy was confined to building small, coastal defence ships, primarily minesweepers and missile boats. Fourteen hulls of the Kuha class were ordered in 1972. The last eight were cancelled, with only the first six hulls beginning construction in 1974. Built by Oy Laivateollisuus Ab, Turku, Finland, the six ships of the class entered service in 1974–1975. Beginning in 1983, they worked in conjunction with the  drone minesweepers, which could either be unmanned or manned. The vessels underwent modernisation at Tyovene Shipyard in Uusikaupunki, Finland were they were lengthened to accommodate new minesweeping control systems and new magnetic and acoustic sweeps. Kuha 21 completed its refit on 22 December 1997, Kuha 23 on 30 August 1998, Kuha 24 on 13 November 1998 and Kuha 26 on 30 May 2000. Kuha 22 and Kuha 25 were withdrawn from service in 2012. The rest of the Kuha class will be retired when the s enter active service.

Citations

References
 
 
 
 

Ships of the Finnish Navy
Minesweepers of the Finnish Navy
Mine warfare vessel classes
Ships built in Turku